Norfolk Coast may refer to:

Norfolk Coast AONB, an Area of Outstanding Natural Beauty as defined by the organisation Natural England
Norfolk Coast Path, part of the Peddars Way and Norfolk Coast Path, a National Trail this part of which runs along the coastal edge of the Norfolk Coast AONB
Norfolk Coast (album), an album by The Stranglers released in 2004, and it is also the name of a short film featuring rearranged music from the album